"True Colors" is the twentieth episode and the season finale of the second season of the American animated television series Amphibia, and the 40th episode of the series overall. The episode was written by Michele Cavin and Jenava Mie and directed by Kyler Spears and Jenn Strickland. The episode aired on May 22, 2021, and it garnered 0.33 million viewers when it premiered.

The episode revolves around Anne and her friends arriving at Newtopia in their quest to return home, leading to a set of fateful discoveries and betrayals as they discover that someone else has set other plans for her and her friends in motion.

The episode received widespread universal acclaim for its fluid animation, voice acting, character development, mature themes, dark tone, emotional depth, action sequences, choreography, cinematography, musical score, scale, writing, storytelling and cliffhanger. Many fans and critics have called it one of, if not the best, episodes of the series.

Plot
The episode begins with a flashback of Marcy at the library reading about the Calamity Box when she gets a text message from Sasha about Anne's birthday. She later gets another text message from her parents about something important. After talking with them, which seems to lead to an argument between them, Marcy runs out of her house in tears until she arrives at a thrift store with the Calamity Box inside. She texts Sasha about the perfect present for Anne.

Back in the present, Anne, Sasha, Marcy, Sprig, Polly, Hop Pop, Grime, and Frobo arrive at Newtopia on Joe Sparrow to give the Calamity Box to King Andrias. On their way to the castle, Polly starts to feel itchy in her butt while Sprig asks Anne if their adventures could last forever. Upon their arrival at the castle, Anne prepares to give the Calamity Box to Andrias, but it is taken by Grime and Sasha, who commence their plan for a toad rebellion on Newtopia, even getting Andrias to surrender by threatening to drop the box. Anne voices her anger at Sasha for betraying them and declares she is done being friends with her. In anger, Sasha tries to use the box to send Anne and Marcy home, but it doesn't work, so she has them all imprisoned until she finds out how to use it. Anne, Marcy, Sprig, Polly, Hop Pop, Frobo, and Lady Olivia are then rescued by General Yunan and take shelter in an old restaurant. Anne then rallies everyone to fight back against the toad rebellion and comes up with a plan; Marcy, Hop Pop, and Lady Olivia will save King Andrias while Polly, Frobo, and General Yunan fight the toad soldiers; Then Anne and Sprig will close the gates before the whole toad army arrives. 

Meanwhile, back in the throne room, Sasha starts to feel guilty about betraying Anne and wonders if she is a horrible person. Grime tries to cheer her up by handing her another heron sword and helping her remove a tapestry of a benevolent Andrias, only to find a mural of a sinister-looking Andrias using the Calamity Box to cause chaos and destruction. They realize that Andrias is not what he seems, and after seeing Anne and Sprig trying to close the gates, they rush out to stop them. While Sprig deals with Grime, Sasha tries to warn Anne about Andrias, but Anne, still furious with Sasha, refuses to listen and they begin to fight. Eventually, Anne and Sprig defeat Sasha and Grime and manage to close the gates. Andrias then appears and orders his guard to arrest the toad soldiers, ending the rebellion.

Back in the throne room, Anne, Sprig, Polly, Frobo, and General Yunan are waiting for Andrias, with Sasha and Grime tied up. Andrias then arrives with Marcy, Hop Pop, and Lady Olivia and is ready to send the girls home. Despite Sasha's warnings, Anne gives the Calamity Box to Andrias, who tells them a tale. Long ago, Newtopia was a glorious kingdom of greatness until that greatness was lost when the Calamity Box was stolen from him because he trusted those he thought were his friends. But now that the box is back, he can finally return his kingdom to glory, revealing that his ancestors were not explorers, but conquerors. He puts the Calamity Box on a pedestal, which causes his castle to rise up into the sky, and reactivates his robot army, he reveals that with the Calamity Box he will not only rule all of Amphibia but all other worlds as well, demonstrating his power by destroying one of the Toad Towers. Marcy tries to talk to Andrias saying that it wasn't part of the deal, but Andrias reveals he lied to her. He also reveals to Anne and Sasha that Marcy had full knowledge of the Calamity Box and got them all stuck in Amphibia on purpose. Marcy reveals that on the day they left, her parents told her that they were moving away, but Marcy, not wanting to be apart from her friends, decided to use the Calamity Box to keep them all together in Amphibia.

Despite the mistakes they all have made, Anne, realizing who Andrias really is, tells her friends that he must be stopped. Anne then frees Sasha and Grime, who fight beside her and the Plantars, as do Yunan, Olivia, and Marcy; during the fight, Frobo gets destroyed and Polly grows a pair of legs, which was the cause of her itchiness from before. As Polly gets the box, Andrias threatens her to put it back or he'll drop Sprig out the window. Despite putting it back, Andrias still drops Sprig. Anne, devastated by the loss of Sprig, awakens her powers through the blue gem from the Calamity Box and fights off Andrias and the rest of his robots; however, she faints, exhausted from the power. Sprig, having been saved by Marcy on Joe Sparrow, arrives and hugs her. However, because of Anne's new power, Andrias can't let her live and prepares to kill them, but Marcy takes the Calamity Box and uses it to open a portal back to Earth. Anne and the Plantars manage to escape with Frobo's remains while Sasha and Grime continue to fight off Andrias. Andrias then mortally impales Marcy with his light sword through her chest, which makes her drop the Calamity Box as Anne calls out in shock while dying Marcy falls unconsciously to the ground.

Anne and the Plantars then wake up on Earth in Anne's hometown of Los Angeles.

Production
The episode starts off with a content warning advising viewers that the episode has scenes that might be too intense for younger viewers. This is the only Amphibia episode that has this content warning. The episode also contains a post-credits scene that consists of the theme song for the 3rd and final season of the show which later went through some changes for the season premiere, "The New Normal".

The episode was originally scheduled to premiere on May 1, 2021, but due to a scheduling shift was pushed back 21 days later to May 22, 2021. The episode was accidentally released on iTunes the day after the episode was originally scheduled to premiere, but it was quickly taken down. However, the episode was soon taken and placed on several streaming sites. As a result of that, the creator of the show, Matt Braly, started putting up videos of Amphibia characters telling the viewers not to watch the episode too early. Some of these characters included: Grime, Maddie, Loggle, Yunan, Felicia, Hop Pop, and Curator Ponds. On the iTunes version of the episode, some fans spotted an error where a green newt with a hat was seen with the characters at the climax of the episode. When the error was reported the creators fixed it by replacing the newt with Lady Olivia when the episode officially premiered.

Reception
Since airing, "True Colors" has received widespread universal acclaim. Many call it one of the best episodes of the entire series.

Patrick Gunn from Collider praises the episode for its great character development and describes Andrias as the true star of the episode. Gunn even states that the episode "plays with the bonds both broken and torn throughout the series to create a thrilling triumph. The stakes are higher because they mesh with the themes of friendship throughout the series and builds and expands upon them. Not to mention the amazing animation and fight choreography, particularly during the blue powers fight." Hope Mullex from The Geeky Waffle said the episode was "Gut Punching", Mullex also describes the show itself as a "Fastasticially Written Drama" due to the concept of flawed female characters having their own personal journey in the world of Amphibia.

It was also referenced on the pop culture website TheGamer where it was stated that "King's Tide", the season finale for Season 2 of The Owl House, had a similar ending to this episode. Both shows were even described to being "Kindred Spirits."

References

Television episodes about rebellions
Amphibia (season 2) episodes
2021 American television episodes
Television episodes about sacrifices